Chautala is a village in Dabwali Mandal, Sirsa district in Haryana. Former Haryana chief ministers Devi Lal and Om Prakash Chautala comes from this village, where his ancestors settled in 1919.

Village has a hospital, an industrial training institute, government senior secondary schools for boys and girls, a private secondary school named Sheetal High School, two stadiums and two banks.

Queen's Baton Relay for the 2010 Commonwealth Games passed through this village. 51st  Senior National Volleyball Championship was held in Chaudhary Sahib Ram Stadium, Chautala in 2002.

References 

Villages in Sirsa district